*= may refer to:
 Augmented assignment, an operator for multiplication
 A relational database join, in deprecated SQL syntax

See also
 /= (disambiguation)